Nova Wav is an American record production and songwriting duo composed of Brittany "Chi" Coney and Denisia "Blu June" Andrews. Over the course of their career, Nova Wav has written and produced on tracks and albums for artists including Beyoncé, Rihanna, Dj Khaled, Ariana Grande, Jay-Z, Saweetie, Nicki Minaj, Teyana Taylor, Kehlani and more. They were signed to Warner Chappell Music by Ryan Press and "Big Jon" Platt. They were named Billboards 2018 R&B/Hip-Hop 100 Power Players  and listed on Revolt's Top 9 producers of 2019 that demanded the sound of Hip Hop and R&B.

Members 
Blu June was born in Fort Lauderdale, Florida and raised in Tallahassee, Florida. Chi is a native of Plant City, Florida.

Career 
Blu June and Chi formed the duo Nova Wav in Atlanta, Georgia back in 2011, and received their first placement of their professional career in 2012 co-writing "Loveeeeeee Song" by Rihanna featuring Future. Following the release of Unapologetic, "Loveeeeeee Song" entered the US Billboard Hot 100 at number 100. It ascended to 88 its second week and to 63 in its third week. It additionally debuted at number 14 on the US Hot R&B/Hip-Hop Songs due to strong digital downloads. The song has also peaked at 4 on the Hot R&B/Hip-Hop Airplay chart. On February 21, 2018 Unapologetic was announced 3x Multi-Platinum by the Recording Industry Association of America (RIAA).

In 2014, Nova Wav wrote "Best Mistake" with American recording artist Ariana Grande that features American hip hop recording artist Big Sean and produced by Key Wane. The song was released August 12, 2014 becoming the promotional single for Grande's second studio album, My Everything The album was later announced  2× Multi-Platinum by RIAA on March 22, 2016.

In 2016, Nova Wav teamed up with American singer and songwriter Kehlani to produce and write her lead single "CRZY", which was later released on her studio album SweetSexySavage under Atlantic Records. On February 13, 2019 the record hit over one million copies sold making it Kehlani's first ever Certified Platinum record The single peaked on Billboard Hot 100 at number 85, Mainstream R&B/Hip Hop Charts at number 17, and Hot R&B songs at number 11 on November 26, 2016.

In 2018, the duo won their first GRAMMY Award for co-writing and producing "LoveHappy" and co-writing "Nice", "Friends", and "Black Effect", on The Carters album Everything Is Love which was released on June 16, 2018, by Parkwood Entertainment, Sony Music Entertainment, S.C Enterprises, and Roc Nation. Also that year, they worked alongside Dj Khaled and co-wrote the records "Top Off", "You Stay", "Holy Mountain" and "Just Us" in addition to co-writing and co-producing "Jealous" on his eleventh studio album Father of Asahd which released May 17, 2019, through We the Best Music and Epic Records. The leading single "Top Off" was released on March 2, 2018 selling over 500,000 copies becoming Certified Gold on September 21, 2018. On June 17, 2019, the album Father of Asahd was Certified Gold by the Recording Industry Association of America (RIAA) for combined sales and album-equivalent units of over 500,000 units in the United States.

In 2019, Nova Wav co-wrote the record "Me + You" and "Commitment" for American R&B singer Monica for her ninth studio album, Chapter 38. "Commitment" hit number 1 on Billboard Adult R&B Songs earning Monica her fourth number 1 record in over 10 years, and became the first single on her label, Mondeenise Music.

In 2020, Nova Wav co-wrote Beyoncé's charity single "Black Parade." It was the most nominated song at the 63rd Annual Grammy Awards, with four nominations including Record of the Year and Song of the Year. The song won Best R&B Performance.

In 2022, Nova Wav won their next Grammy Award for Best R&B Performance for their work on Jazmine Sullivan's "Pick Up Your Feelings." Later that year, the duo co-wrote 8 out 16 songs on Beyoncé's highly anticipated album Renaissance.

Discography

Recognition and Awards

References

Record production duos
Songwriting teams
Record producers from Florida
Songwriters from Florida